Isla El Coyote is an island in the Gulf of California, located within Bahía Concepción east of the Baja California Peninsula. The island is uninhabited and is part of the Mulegé Municipality.

Biology
Isla El Coyote has three species of reptiles: Phyllodactylus nocticolus (peninsular leaf-toed gecko), Sauromalus ater (common chuckwalla), and Urosaurus nigricauda (black-tailed brush lizard). There are no amphibians.

References

Further reading

Islands of the Gulf of California
Islands of Baja California Sur
Uninhabited islands of Mexico